Santana is an indigenous territory located approximately 140 km from municípality of Nobres, in the central state of Mato Grosso.

Notes

Indigenous Territories (Brazil)
Protected areas of Mato Grosso